Schizachne is a genus of Eurasian and North American plants in the grass family. The only accepted species is Schizachne purpurascens, commonly called false melic. Three subspecies are recognized:
 Schizachne purpurascens subsp. callosa (Turcz. ex Griseb.) T.Koyama & Kawano – European and Asiatic Russia, China (Hebei, Heilongjiang, Henan, Jilin, Liaoning, Shanxi, Yunnan), Mongolia, Korea, Kazakhstan
 Schizachne purpurascens subsp. capillipes (Kom.) Tzvelev – Kamchatka
 Schizachne purpurascens subsp. purpurascens – Canada (all 10 provinces plus Yukon + NWT), United States (Alaska, Rocky Mountain States, Great Lakes Region, Northeast)

Melica smithii was formerly included in the genus, as Schizachne smithii.

References

Pooideae
Grasses of Asia
Grasses of North America
Grasses of Russia
Grasses of the United States
Monotypic Poaceae genera
Taxa named by Eduard Hackel